Weak may refer to:

Songs
 "Weak" (AJR song), 2016
 "Weak" (Melanie C song), 2011
 "Weak" (SWV song), 1993
 "Weak" (Skunk Anansie song), 1995
 "Weak", a song by Seether from Seether: 2002-2013

Television episodes
 "Weak" (Fear the Walking Dead)
 "Weak" (Law & Order: Special Victims Unit)

See also 
 
 
 Stephen Uroš V of Serbia (1336–1371), also known as Stefan Uroš the Weak, King of Serbia and Emperor of the Serb and Greeks
 Kenyan Weaks (born 1977), American retired basketball player
 Weakness (disambiguation)
 Week